The Asian Tour International was a golf tournament on the Asian Tour, played in Thailand from 2008 to 2010.

In 2009, following the cancellation of the Emaar-MGF Indian Masters, the Asian Tour International was rescheduled to be the season opening event.

Winners

References

External links
Coverage on the Asian Tour's official site

Former Asian Tour events
Golf tournaments in Thailand
Recurring sporting events established in 2008
Recurring sporting events disestablished in 2010
2008 establishments in Thailand
2010 disestablishments in Thailand